Fazlollah Nikkhah (24 July 1930 – 28 May 2014) was an Iranian boxer. He competed in the men's bantamweight event at the 1952 Summer Olympics. At the 1952 Summer Olympics, he lost to Kang Joon-ho of South Korea.

References

1930 births
2014 deaths
Iranian male boxers
Olympic boxers of Iran
Boxers at the 1952 Summer Olympics
Place of birth missing
Bantamweight boxers
20th-century Iranian people